Larry Darnell Griffin Jr. (born August 3, 1976), professionally known as Symbolyc One or S1, is an American record producer from Waco, Texas. He founded the group Strange Fruit Project and is signed to Kanye West's Very GOOD Beats as a producer.

Origin 
Griffin was born August 3, 1976 in Waco, Texas, and grew up there in a Christian household.  In junior high school, he learned alto saxophone and played piano throughout his teen years, including for Sunday school at his local church. After forming a hip hop group in 2007 with his cousin, Myth, Griffin started making beats and producing recording. In 2010, he received his associate degree in audio engineering from McLennan Community College. From 2007-2008, S1 competed in national U.S. beat competitions such as iStandard, Red Bull Big Tune, and Sha Money's One Stop Shop.

Music career 
In his role as main producer of the group Strange Fruit Project, Griffin's style and production range includes R&B, soul, underground and urban/crossover pop. As a platinum-selling producer, S1 has worked with many musical artists, as well as being a core member in singer Erykah Badu’s electronic band The Cannabinoids.

Prominent collaborations include Kanye West's “Power” from the Grammy-winning album My Beautiful Dark Twisted Fantasy, and Beyoncé’s “Best Thing I Never Had” off her album 4, both tracks certified platinum. He appears on rap group Little Brothers second album The Minstrel Show in a skit as well. He also worked on West's Grammy-nominated albums Yeezus and Watch the Throne, a joint project with Jay-Z. As half of the duo The Dividends (with Dallas-based singer-songwriter Sarah Jaffe), Griffin co-wrote and co-produced the Eminem song "Bad Guy" from The Marshall Mathers LP 2, another Grammy-winning album. He also worked on the Madonna album Rebel Heart.

Discography 

Studio albums
 2008: The Music Box

Collaboration albums
 2005: The Art of Onemind (with Illmind)
 2009: Cloud Nineteen (with Braille)

References

External links 
 

1976 births
Living people
Roc Nation artists
Record producers from Texas
People from Waco, Texas
GOOD Music artists